Neil Peter Rees (born 28 April 1978) is a former Welsh international lawn and indoor bowler.

Bowling career
He won a bronze medal in the fours with Dai Wilkins, Ian Slade and Mark Anstey at the 1998 Commonwealth Games in Kuala Lumpur.

He also participated in the 2006 Commonwealth Games in the pairs competition partnering with Jason Greenslade.

He has also won the triples gold medal and fours bronze medal at the Atlantic Bowls Championships and the 1997 and 2012 triples title at the Welsh National Bowls Championships when bowling for Parc-y-Dre BC.

References

External links 
 

1978 births
Living people
Welsh male bowls players
Commonwealth Games bronze medallists for Wales
Commonwealth Games medallists in lawn bowls
Bowls players at the 1998 Commonwealth Games
Bowls players at the 2006 Commonwealth Games
Medallists at the 1998 Commonwealth Games